Clathria rosita is a species of sea sponge first found on the coast of South Georgia Island, in the southwest Southern Ocean.

References

External links
WORMS

Poecilosclerida